Heartbeat is a 2018 role-playing video game created by independent developer Team Chumbosoft. The player controls Eve Staccato, a Conjurer who becomes an adventurer.

Gameplay 
In Heartbeat, the player controls conjurer Eve Staccato as she travels throughout the Outset with the aid of various Mogwai (Mogs). The party is met with a variety of feral Mogs, triggering battles following a traditional turn-based role-playing game battle system. When outside battle, players will have to use their party members' unique skills to pass through a variety of puzzles.

Players can use yuan to buy items and equipment or use alchemy to create items and weapons with additional skills. As the plot progresses, more complex recipes will become available. There are also weapons available in the world obtainable by completing puzzles.

It is possible to continue the game after the main plot; more sidequests and content will become available. Eve will have a new special ability "Conjure" that can switch any past party members to the current party, allowing to complete puzzles that require multiple partner skills as well as create ideal party composition against harder enemies and circuits.

Reception
Rock, Paper, Shotgun praised the game's dialogue, combat sprites, and the depth of the combat system.

Controversy 
The game garnered controversy after developer Shepple and her girlfriend Nikotine were accused of transphobia following comments made on Twitter and Discord. Nikotine posted a thread on Twitter discussing how she personally felt "ashamed to be born" in the United States due to the recent social focus on transgender activism, labelling male-to-female transgender individuals as "men [who] believe they can mutilate their penis and dress in an 'effeminate' manner to become 'female'". Shortly after these public statements, the game was set to 41% off, which aligns with a poll conducted by the National Transgender Discrimination Survey which found that roughly 41% of transgender people thought of committing suicide.

References

External links 
Official website

2018 video games
RPG Maker games
Indie video games
Art games
Obscenity controversies in video games
Role-playing video games
LGBT-related video games
Single-player video games
Video game controversies
Video games featuring female protagonists
Video games developed in the United States
Windows games
MacOS games
Commercial video games with freely available source code